The 2022 Edge Istanbul was a professional tennis tournament played on outdoor clay courts. It was the first edition of the tournament which was part of the 2022 ITF Women's World Tennis Tour. It took place in Istanbul, Turkey between 25 April and 1 May 2022.

Singles main draw entrants

Seeds

 1 Rankings are as of 18 April 2022.

Other entrants
The following players received wildcards into the singles main draw:
  Amina Anshba
  Berfu Cengiz
  Zeynep Sönmez
  İlay Yörük

The following player received entry using a junior exempt:
  Diana Shnaider

The following player received entry as a special exempt:
  Camilla Rosatello

The following players received entry from the qualifying draw:
  Nikola Bartůňková
  Maja Chwalińska
  Nicoleta Dascălu
  Ángela Fita Boluda
  Oana Gavrilă
  Lia Karatancheva
  Andreea Prisăcariu
  Natalija Stevanović

The following player received entry as a lucky loser:
  Ayla Aksu

Champions

Singles

  Diana Shnaider def.  Nikola Bartůňková, 7–5, 7–5

Doubles

  Maja Chwalińska /  Jesika Malečková def.  Berfu Cengiz /  Anastasia Tikhonova, 2–6, 6–4, [10–7]

References

External links
 2022 Edge Istanbul at ITFtennis.com

2022 ITF Women's World Tennis Tour
2022 in Turkish sport
April 2022 sports events in Turkey
May 2022 sports events in Turkey